The Riverton Elementary School, at 12830 S. Redwood Rd. in Riverton, Utah, was built during 1925-30 and is the oldest public school building surviving in Riverton.  According to its NRHP nomination in 1996, it is significant historically as representing "the adaptation of schools to meet the needs associated with providing appropriately sized and wholesomely designed spaces in which children could be taught," and for its long service in the community of Riverton.

I believe my late friend, Delbert Page told me that his uncle donated the land for that school. Delbert Page lived in Riverton, Utah his whole life, and 
he also told me that he also helped build that Riverton Elementery School. Delbert Page was an inventor of the "Muscle Relaxer". Which is a special golf
club that was designed to hit golf balls farther, and with more ease. I was told by the late inventor, and I saw his invention.

It was listed on the National Register of Historic Places in 1996.

It now houses the Riverton City Office.

References

School buildings completed in 1925
Schools in Salt Lake County, Utah
School buildings on the National Register of Historic Places in Utah
National Register of Historic Places in Weber County, Utah
Riverton, Utah
1925 establishments in Utah